Nikolskoye is a rural locality (a selo) and the administrative center of Nikolsky Selsoviet of Belogorsky District, Amur Oblast, Russia. The population was 1449 as of 2018. There are 10 streets.

Geography 
Nikolskoye is located on the left bank of the Tom River, 14 km west of Belogorsk (the district's administrative centre) by road. Klyuchi is the nearest rural locality.

References 

Rural localities in Belogorsky District